Archbishop Charles Agyinasare (English pronunciation: / ɑdʒɪnəsɑ:ri / born 22 March 1962) is a Ghanaian pastor who founded the Word Miracle Church International, later Perez Chapel International, a Pentecostal-Charismatic ministry in Ghana. He is the founder of Precious TV, Chancellor of the Perez University College and author of several books on Christianity.

Early life
Archbishop Charles Agyinasare was born Charles Yewuraekow Agyinasare in Achiase in the Eastern Region of Ghana on March 22, 1962. He later moved to Accra in the Greater Accra Region to attend school. He is a past student of Weija Barracks Primary, Armed Forces Experimental School and Nsawam St. Martins. There, he was a “women-chasing college freak” who got caught up in what he calls “sin, revelry, alcoholism and drug addiction” and “a life of smoking, truancy, chasing girls, using hard drugs, night-clubbing, and stints with various occult associations”. He was later expelled from St. Martin’s. In 1980, Agyinasare was invited to the Church of Pentecost, where, at the age of 18, he converted to Christianity, was delivered from his immoral life, and joined the Church of Pentecost. In 2011 Agyinasare did a statutory declaration as to change of name to Charles Agyinasare.

Ministry
In 1984, Agyinasare was ordained as a missionary by Enoch Agbodzo. In 1986, he traveled to Nigeria to study crusade planning under the leadership of Benson Idahosa in Benin City, Nigeria. He is currently (2015) the senior pastor of the Perez Dome, which has a 14,000-seater auditorium, regarded as the largest auditorium in Ghana. The President of Ghana, John Dramani Mahama, on a visit described the place of worship as "one of the Seven Wonders of Ghana".

Impact
In 2007 Agyinasare received a national award – the Member of the Order of the Volta (MV) – by former President of the Republic of Ghana John Agyekum Kufuor, for his outstanding achievements in championing African excellence as a religious leader. In 2015, Agyinasare was awarded The Global Leadership Award from Regent University, USA by Professor Clifton Clarke in recognition of his efforts in raising leaders across the world and for his impact across the globe. He has been given declarations from the State of Texas and is an honorary citizen of Texas. Agyinasare was said to be the 20th Most Influential Ghanaian according to a poll in Ghana that was taken in 2015

External links
 Facebook Page
 Perez Chapel Official Website

References

1962 births
Living people
Ghanaian religious leaders
Discrimination in Ghana
Ghanaian Pentecostals
Recipients of the Order of the Volta
Ghana Institute of Management and Public Administration alumni
Converts to Christianity